Girls for the Mambo-Bar is a 1959 West German crime film directed by Wolfgang Glück and starring Kai Fischer, Gerlinde Locker and Jimmy Makulis.

The film's sets were designed by the art directors Felix Smetana.

Cast
 Kai Fischer as Olga
 Gerlinde Locker as Eva
 Jimmy Makulis as Jimmy
 Rolf Kutschera as Martini
 Edith Elmay
 Wolf Albach-Retty as Krüger
 Rolf Olsen as Rutka
 Horst Beck
 Guido Wieland
 Raoul Retzer
 Inge Rassaerts
 Renate Rohm
 Aina Capell
 Josef Hendrichs
 Hansi Prinz
 Mona Baptiste
 Macky Kaspar
 Gaby King
 Dalida
 Alfred Böhm
 Fatty George
 Habiba
 Sieghardt Rupp as Tommy Kersten

References

Bibliography
 Joachim Lembach. The standing of the German cinema in Great Britain after 1945. Edwin Mellen Press, 2003.

External links 
 

1959 films
1959 crime films
German crime films
West German films
1950s German-language films
Films directed by Wolfgang Glück
1950s German films